My Woman is a 1933 American pre-Code drama romance film directed by Victor Schertzinger and starring Helen Twelvetrees, Victor Jory and Wallace Ford.

Plot
A devoted wife helps her husband achieve success as a radio comic, but stardom comes at a price.

Cast
 Helen Twelvetrees as Connie Riley Rollins
 Victor Jory as John Bradley
 Wallace Ford as Chick Rollins
 Claire Dodd as Muriel Bennett
 Hobart Cavanaugh as Mr. Miller
 Harry Holman as Lou
 Charles Lane as Conn (as Charles Levison)
 Raymond Brown as Pop Riley

External links
 

1933 films
1933 romantic drama films
American romantic drama films
Columbia Pictures films
American black-and-white films
Films about radio people
Films directed by Victor Schertzinger
1930s American films